Chariots of Fire is a British film released in 1981.

Chariots of Fire may also refer to:

Chariots of Fire (play), the 2012 play based on the film
 A line from William Blake's poem And did those feet in ancient time to which the film's title alludes.
 The chariot of Elijah the prophet in which he rode to heaven to which the Blake poem alludes.

In music
 Chariots of Fire (album), the original score album from the film
 "Chariots of Fire" (instrumental), the instrumental theme from the film
 "Chariots of Fire", an unreleased single by Bodies Without Organs
 "Chariots of Fire", a song by Bathory from their album Under the Sign of the Black Mark
 "Chariots of Fire", a song by Al Green from The Belle Album (1977)
 "Chariots of Fire", a song by Raury from his album Indigo Child

In other uses
 Chariots of Fire (race), an annual race in Cambridge, England
 Chariots of Fire (harness race), a horse race in Australia
 Articulated buses in London, which were nicknamed "Chariots of Fire" following a series of fires involving the buses.